Win Naing Tun (born 3 May 2000) is a Burmese professional footballer who plays as a striker for Yangon United. He is considered the most promising striker in Burmese football. He won a bronze medal at the 2019 SEA Games.

Early life
Win Naing Tun was born on 3 May 2000 in Saipyingyi Village, Depayin in Sagaing Region. He went to the Myanmar Football Academy.

Career
In 2017, Yadanarbon FC signed Win Naing Tun from the Myanmar Football Academy. He scored his first time ever goal for Yadanarbon against Shan United.

In December 2018, he received the best player award at the Thanh Niên Newspaper International U-21 Football Tournament held in Vietnam. He won the Player of the Month for January at the 2019 Myanmar National League (MNL).

In 2020, he signed for Ayeyawady United.

He joined Yangon United in 2021, but the league was cancelled for the year. Win Naing Tun played his first match against Shan United but got sent off in the first ten minutes. He scored his first Lions goal against Mahar United, and scored five in a 10-0 battering against relegation-candidates Rakhine United.

In addition to his club successes that year, Win Naing Tun represented Myanmar in the AFF Mitsubishi Electric Cup. However, he failed to make an impact, missing a penalty in the opening match against Malaysia and failing to make an appearance for the match against Vietnam.

International

International goals

Honours

International
Southeast Asian Games:  Bronze medal 2019

Individual
2018: Best Player of the Thanh Niên Newspaper International U-21 Football Tournament

AFF U-19 Youth Championship top scorer: 2018

References

2000 births
Living people
Burmese footballers
Myanmar international footballers
Association football forwards
Yadanarbon F.C. players
People from Sagaing Region
Competitors at the 2019 Southeast Asian Games
Southeast Asian Games medalists in football
Southeast Asian Games bronze medalists for Myanmar
Competitors at the 2021 Southeast Asian Games